Mario Gelli (born 27 January 1957) is a former Italian male long-distance runner who competed at two editions of the IAAF World Cross Country Championships at senior level (1981, 1982).

References

External links
 Mario Gelli profile at Association of Road Racing Statisticians

1957 births
Living people
Italian male long-distance runners